A baseball cap is a type of soft hat with a rounded crown and a stiff bill projecting in front.

The front of the hat typically displays a design or a logo (historically, usually only a sports team, namely a baseball team, or names of relevant companies, when used as a commercial marketing technique). The hat may be "fitted" to the wearer's head or the back may have elastic, a plastic prong-in-a-hole (multiple holes with one prong that can be inserted), Velcro, a zipper, or a tri-glide slide so that it can be quickly adjusted to fit different wearers' heads. The baseball hat is a part of the traditional baseball uniform worn by players, with the brim pointing forward to shield the eyes from the sun.  Since the 1980s, varieties of the hat have become prevalent in the United States and many other nations, both for utilitarian (protecting the eyes from the sun) and fashion accessory purposes.

History 

In 1860, the Brooklyn Excelsiors wore the ancestor of the modern rounded-top baseball cap, which featured a long peak and a button on top, and by 1900, the "Brooklyn style" cap became popular.

During the 1940s, latex rubber became the stiffening material inside the hat and the modern baseball cap was born. The peak, also known in certain areas as the "bill" or "brim", was designed to protect a player's eyes from the sun. Typically, the peak was much shorter in the earlier days of the baseball hat. Also, the hat has become more structured, versus the overall "floppy" cap of the 19th and early 20th centuries. The baseball cap was and still is an important means by which to identify a team. Often the logo, mascot, or team's initial was placed on the cap. Usually, the cap was also fashioned in the official colors of a particular team.

The basic shape, including curved peak, is similar to some styles of 19th-century sunbonnets.

Design 
Fitted baseball hats — those without an adjuster — are normally sewn in six sections, and may be topped with a matching fabric-covered button (also called a squatchee) on the crown. Metal grommets or fabric eyelets are often sewn or attached near the top of each of the six sections of fabric to provide ventilation. In some cases, the rear sections of the crown are made of net-like mesh material for extra ventilation. The peak is typically stiffened by a sewn-in piece of paperboard or stiff plastic.

Variations 
Baseball hats are made of many types of material and shaped in various styles for different purposes. Major and minor league baseball players wear classic-style hats made of wool (or, more recently, polyester) with their team's simple logo and colors; the logo is usually embroidered into the fabric. More recently there are brands that are using uncommon materials for snapback hats as for example wood brims.

Formerly, baseball hats only came in standard hat sizes. Since the early 1970s, they have also been available in a one-size-fits-all form, with an adjustment strap in the back. The style, commonly called snapback, has become increasingly popular as fashion accessories. Advances in textiles have led to the "stretch-fit" hat, which uses Lycra or rubber to allow a hat to have a fitted style while still being "adjustable" within sizes.

The front may be soft, or may be stiffened by buckram to display a logo more clearly.

Another version of the baseball hat is a plastic mesh hat with a foam front imprinted with a company logo. This style is sometimes called a trucker hat or a "gimme hat" because it is given away for free as a promotional item.

Dad hats are unstructured hats with a low profile, curved brim, and stripe on the back.

There are 4 major types of baseball hats:

 Snapback hat – (hat with a snap closure in the rear) with flat brim, high profile, adjustable.
 Adjustable hat – (hat with a velcro closure or buckled strap in the rear) unstructured, low profile, curved brim, adjustable.
"Flexfit" hat – curved or flat brim, structured cap, high profile, adjustable by the use of elastic materials.
 Fitted hat – curved or flat brim, structured cap, high profile, unadjustable.

Athletic use 

Beginning with the 2014 season, MLB Pitchers are permitted to wear a special reinforced hat to protect their heads from line drives.

Athletes in other sports wear hats with their team's logo and colors as "sideline" hats; both types are also sold as authentic team merchandise in retail stores. Other hats may simply have a maker's logo, such as Reebok, Nike or Carhartt; these hats are often made of brushed cotton. Golfers tend to prefer the sports visor form which does not cover the head but keeps the sun out of their eyes; women also traditionally have worn visors casually but a trend in certain youth subcultures sees an increase in feminine use of full hats.

Professional use

Military 

Some armed forces use baseball caps as part of their uniforms, usually with combat uniforms.

Those of the United States Armed Forces are worn mostly with utility uniforms and coveralls. They sometimes have a command logo on the front to denote command affiliation. Alternatively, the cap may have the wearer's rank on the front, if an officer. Baseball caps of a particular color are worn to denote a specific function of a person or particular job.  For example, in the United States submarine force, red baseball caps are worn by drill monitors who facilitate and critique members of the boat's crew during drills. In the United States Army, parachute riggers wear red baseball caps and parachute instructors wear black baseball caps as part of their uniform. In various squadrons of the United States Air Force's civilian auxiliary, squadron-distinctive baseball caps have been issued as headgear (or "cover") for the Battle Dress Uniform, typically displaying squadron colors, squadron number, and/or squadron patch. Although the BDUs have their own cover, a patrol cap in M81 Woodland, some squadrons have opted for more distinctive covers.

Police 

There has been a marked trend in recent years among police forces and other uniformed bodies throughout the world to substitute inexpensive and comfortable baseball caps for peaked caps and other traditional headdresses. The baseball cap is also commonly used by private security companies as a cheap, practical piece of uniform headgear.

Many armed police units around the world, notably SWAT in the United States and the Metropolitan Police Specialist Firearms Command in the UK, often wear baseball caps to shield their eyes from the sun where a full helmet would be excessive.

The Finnish Police uses a baseball cap, which has mostly replaced the traditional side cap. It is marked with the police emblem and "Police" in Finnish and Swedish and is thus considered an official identification device that cannot be worn, or even displayed by civilians. 

In the United Kingdom, the baseball cap has the additional advantage of being unisex and suitable for wear by both male and female officers. Throughout 2017, the Northamptonshire, Cheshire and Lancashire police forces adopted specially strengthened baseball caps known as "Bump Caps", to replace the helmets and bowler hats previously worn. However, the Northamptonshire force announced in November 2018 that their "Bump Caps" had proven scruffy and unpopular, and would be withdrawn from use.

In Slovenia, policemen on motorcycles wear baseball caps as a part of their uniform, when they remove the helmet.

Turkish police switched from peaked caps to baseball caps in the 1990s.

In many United States police forces, the baseball cap is worn as a more practical alternative to the traditional peaked cap or campaign hat, the latter of which is generally used by Sheriff's departments and state police forces. Baseball caps are more common on the West Coast, whereas in eastern states, the traditional peaked cap is more prominent. A notable exception is the San Francisco Police Department, where peaked caps are still worn regularly.

See also 

 Baseball clothing and equipment
 Beanie (seamed cap)
 Cricket cap, a similar cap in a similar sport
 Flat cap
 Kepi
 List of headgear

References

External links 

 "Happy 50th Baseball caps" – BBC News
 Types of caps and related terminology

American fashion
Baseball equipment
Canadian fashion
Caps
Fashion accessories
Hip hop fashion
History of clothing (Western fashion)
Sportswear